= 2010 Bamberg Super Cup =

Tournament details
- Dates: August 13 – August 15
- Teams: 4

Final positions
- Champions: Lithuania

2010 Bamberg Super Cup was a mini-tournament held between 4 European national basketball teams in preparation for the 2010 FIBA World Championship. The tournament was held from August 13 until August 15 in Bamberg, Germany. Lithuania won the tournament with a 3–0 record.

== Participants ==
- Germany - host nation
- Turkey
- Croatia
- Lithuania

== Standings ==
| Team | Pld | W | L | PF | PA | PD | Pts |
|---|---|---|---|---|---|---|---|
| Lithuania | 3 | 3 | 0 | 251 | 226 | +25 | 6 |
| Croatia | 3 | 2 | 1 | 233 | 221 | +12 | 5 |
| Germany | 3 | 1 | 2 | 202 | 211 | −9 | 4 |
| Turkey | 3 | 0 | 3 | 192 | 220 | −28 | 3 |

== Results ==
August 13

| Germany | 67–79 | Croatia |
Scoring by quarter: 23-16, 7-20, 17-18, 20-25

Bamberg, Germany

August 13

| Lithuania | 80–77 | Turkey |
Scoring by quarter: 23-18, 15-16, 22-26, 20-17

Bamberg, Germany

August 14

| Turkey | 61–72 | Croatia |
Scoring by quarter: 15-22, 12-15, 16-16, 18-19

Bamberg, Germany

August 14

| Germany | 67–78 | Lithuania |
Scoring by quarter: 25-22, 10-18, 11-18, 21-20

Bamberg, Germany

August 15

| Lithuania | 93–82 | Croatia |
Scoring by quarter: 17-24, 26-21, 23-24, 27-13

Bamberg, Germany

August 15

| Germany | 68–54 | Turkey |
Scoring by quarter: 14-17, 23-9, 19-9, 12-19

Bamberg, Germany
